First Lady of the Maldives is the title attributed to the wife of the president of the Maldives. The title of First Lady is utilized by the government and official publications. The country's current first lady is Fazna Ahmed, wife of President Ibrahim Mohamed Solih, who had held the position since November 17, 2018. There has been no first gentleman of the Maldives to date.

The Maldives was a sultanate from 1965 until 1968. The Second Republic of the Maldives was established in 1968 with the President as head of state. The position of First Lady was established in 1968 with the establishment of the post-independence presidency.

First ladies of the Maldives

References

Maldives